Iitoyo (飯豊青皇女 Princess-Iitoyo, 440-484), was a Japanese Imperial princess and possibly empress regnant. She was, according to traditional legend, ruler for a short period between Emperor Seinei and Emperor Kenzō.

Descent 
Princess Iitoyo, like the reigning Emperor Kenzō (Prince Oke ; ruled 485–487) and Ninken (Prince Ōke ; ruled 488–498) are said to be descended from the 17th Emperor Richū (ruled 400–405). The exact degree of this relationship is shown differently in the earliest chronicles from the 8th century :

After the Kojiki of 712, Iitoyo was the younger sister of the imperial prince Ichinobe no Oshiwa and thus the daughter of Emperor Richū and aunt of the princes Ōke and Oke. 

In turn, according to the Nihon Shoki of 720, Iitoyo was the daughter of the prince and his wife Hayehime, making her the sister of Ōke and Oke and, like the two, a grandchild of Emperor Richū.

Regency 
According to the chronicles mentioned, after the death of the 20th Emperor Ankō (presumably ruled 453–456), his brother murdered all rivals who could claim the throne, and then ruled as the 21st Emperor Yūryaku (presumably ruled 456–479). His victims included above all his cousin Prince Ichinobe no Oshiwa, who was the eldest son and crown prince of Emperor Richū. While we learn that Oshiwa's sons Ōke and Oke fled to the province after his murder, there is no information about their aunt (sister, according to the Nihon shoki) Iitoyo during this time.

Iitoyo appears in the chronicles for the first time in the history of the 22nd Emperor Seinei (presumably ruled 479–484), the son and successor of Emperor Yūryaku. Seinei had no children and otherwise no close relatives. Princes Ōke and Oke were in hiding, so another suitable heir to the throne from the lineage of the Sun Goddess Amaterasu had to be sought.

According to the Kojiki, this search ended with the discovery of Princess Iitoyo at the Tsunusashi Palace, in Oshinumi, in Kazuragi. She then appears to have taken over as regent until Wodate, the governor of Harima province, sent a message to the capital after his discovery of princes Ōke and Oke. Iitoyo then gave the order to bring her nephews to her in the palace, where she presumably handed the rule over to Ōke.

The course of these events is presented somewhat differently in the Nihon Shoki. The princes are found before the death of Emperor Seinei, so that he can elevate the older Ōke himself to the crown prince and Oke to the imperial prince. Iitoyo is briefly mentioned here for the first time in the narrative of Emperor Kenzo. The princes, after the death of Seinei, cannot agree which should succeed, since each wanted to leave the throne to the other. In the resulting interregnum, Iitoyo took over the reign and ruled the country from the Tsunuzashi Palace in Oshinomi. She gave herself the title Oshinomi no Ihitoyo no Awo no Mikoto, After eleven months in the winter of the same year, she died and was buried in a burial site (misasagi) on Mount Haniguchi in Katsuraki.

Reception 
After Empress Jingū, Princess Iitoyo is the second woman described in the chronicles as having governed the country for a certain period of time. But she is generally not recognized as a ruling empress by historians and she does not appear in the official Japanese Emperor lists. In the 1219 Japanese historical work Gukanshō, written by the Buddhist monk Jien, Iitoyo was reigning empress, based on the explanation:"Since the two brothers were adamant to let the other go first, in the second month of the year in which Seine died, their young sister, Seine, succeeded the throne as ruling empress. But she herself died at 12 months [Note .: elsewhere 11 months  ] of the same year. Perhaps this is the reason why we do not find their reign in the usual Imperial Chronicles and why we do not know anything about them. She was called Empress Iitoyo and it is said that they in Kinoe plans of the year 60-year cycle had prevailed.

(Since the two brothers were unbending in deferring to each other, their young sister followed Seine on the throne as a reigning empress in the second month of the year in which Seine died. But she herself died in the 12th month of that same year. Perhaps that it is why we not find her reign listed in the ordinary Imperial chronologies and why people know nothing at all about her. She was calles Empress Iitoyo and it is said that her reign was in the kinoe-ne year of the sexegenary cycle. ) "

- Jien: Gukanshō Iitoyo's entry as Empress Tsunuzashi in the Emperor list by Ernest Mason Satow, Japanese Chronological Tables , 1874.

Even after Isaac Titsingh's translation of Nihon Ōdai Ichiran , which was written in 1625, Iitoyo was not counted among the official tennō because she had ruled for less than ten months, but she had been given a posthumous Empress name after her death (Japanese: 飯豊天皇 Empress Iitoyo).  Iitoyo is also under other posthumous Empress name (Okurina) such as Empress Pagei  and Empress Tsunuzachi  also recognized as a sovereign empress on various occasions, for which information can also be found in the Nihon Shoki, if there is the term for her death bō is used, which is otherwise reserved exclusively for Emperors.

Historians have a variety of theories about their reign: Iitoyo, according to one, may be identical to Queen Taiyoo, a successor to Himiko, who ruled Yamatai. The historian Shinobu Orikuchi sees her as the first ruling empress in the history of Japan, who combines the roles of the shaman and the sovereign. Mitakō Mihoo, on the other hand, believes that Iitoyo was a rival ruler at the time of the 26th Emperor Keitai (traditionally ruled 507–531) before he became ruler of a unified Yamato. Mizuno Yū even argues that the Emperors Seinei, Kenzō, and Ninken did not exist at all, and that Iitoyo reigned after Emperor Yūryaku for 15 years.

Sources 

 Kojiki → Basil Hall Chamberlain: A Translation of the “Ko-ji-ki,” or “Records of ancient matters” , Read before the Asiatic Society of Japan April 12, May 10, and June 21, 1882; Reprinted, May, 1919.
 Nihonshoki → William George Aston: Nihongi: Chronicles of Japan from the Earliest Times to AD 697 , Vol. 1, London: The Japan Society 1896.
 Gukanshō → Delmer M. Brown, Ichirō Ishida: The Future and the Past: a translation and study of the Gukanshō, an interpretative history of Japan written in 1219 , University of California Press 1979.
 Nihon Ōdai Ichiran → Isaac Titsingh (ed.): Nipon o daï itsi ran ou Annales des empereurs du Japon. ; French translation by Hayashi Gahō: Nihon Ōdai Ichiran , 1652; Paris: Oriental Translation Fund of Great Britain and Ireland in 1834. P. 29

Bibliography 

 Louis-Frédéric (translated by Käthe Roth): Japan Encyclopedia , Harvard University Press 2005.
 Ernest Mason Satow: Japanese Chronological Tables (et al.) , Reprinted by Yedo 1874, Bristol: Ganesha 1998.
 Ben-Ami Shillony: Enigma of the Emperors: Sacred subservience in Japanese History , Global Oriental 2005.
 Joan R. Piggott: Chieftain Pairs and Corulers: Female Sovereignty in Early Japan , in: Hitomi Tonomura, Anne Walthall, Wakita Haruko (ed.): Woman and Class in Japanese History , Michigan Monograph Series in Japahese Studies, No. 25, Ann Arbor: Center for Japanese Studies, University Michigan

References

5th-century deaths
5th-century women rulers
440 births
484 deaths
Japanese princesses
Japanese empresses regnant
People of Kofun-period Japan
5th-century Japanese monarchs
Women rulers in Japan